LeeMujin Service is a South Korean talk show and live music web television program hosted by South Korean singer-songwriter Lee Mu-jin. The program aired every Tuesday at 6 pm KST on YouTube channel, KBS Kpop and a re-run on KBS2 every Wednesday at 12 pm KST. It features live music performances without an audience.

Overview
LeeMujin Service is a high-quality live content that provides the best music service that captivates the eyes and ears of music fans around the world with artists by Lee Mu-jin, a representative singer-songwriter of the MZ generation that encompasses all generations.

Format
The format involves Lee Mu-jin opening the show with a song by his guest's group or their song, such as in episode one, he sang "Senorita" by (G)I-dle's Minnie. Then, the show proceeds with the guest singing two songs and then a duet with Lee, which the guest pick beforehand. Through the show, the keyboardist's hand was only visible. The standard show is Lee, and one guest sings four songs, but in some episodes where there are two guests (such as the episode featuring Fromis9's Hayoung and Jiwon), each sings only one song or a guest (such as the episode featuring Nmixx's Lily) sang five songs including a duet song.

Development
This show marks Lee Mu-jin's debut as an MC.

Band
 Jeon Dae-hoon (born 2001) – Piano

Overview

Guests
This is a list of groups with multiple appearances on this show

Episodes

2022–present

Special

Reception
In an episode broadcast on June 25, 2022, Lee Mu-jin appeared as a contestant in Immortal Songs: Singing the Legend, Hwang Chi-yeul praised Lee saying: He is good at talking and sings well. After one or two broadcasts, when I watch TV at home, I think, 'I wish I had done that'.

Awards and nominations

Notes

References

External links
  
 
 
 

Korean Broadcasting System original programming
2020s South Korean television series
2020s YouTube series
2022 South Korean television series debuts
2022 web series debuts
South Korean music television shows
South Korean web series
Korean-language television shows
K-pop television series